Kokomo Murase (born 7 November 2004) is a Japanese snowboarder who competes in the slopestyle and big air events. She competed in the women's slopestyle event at the 2022 Winter Olympics. She also won the overall title in the slopestyle and freestyle at the 2021–22 FIS Snowboard World Cup.

References

External links
 

2004 births
Living people
X Games athletes
Japanese female snowboarders
Snowboarders at the 2022 Winter Olympics
Olympic snowboarders of Japan
Medalists at the 2022 Winter Olympics
Olympic bronze medalists for Japan
Olympic medalists in snowboarding
21st-century Japanese women